Jorge Pardo may refer to:

Jorge Pardo (artist)
Jorge Pardo (musician) (born 1955), Spanish musician
J. D. Pardo (born 1980), American film and television actor